The 1974 Grote Prijs Jef Scherens was the tenth edition of the Grote Prijs Jef Scherens cycle race and was held on 15 September 1974. The race started and finished in Leuven. The race was won by Freddy Maertens.

General classification

References

1974
1974 in road cycling
1974 in Belgian sport